Breene Harimoto (May 6, 1954 – June 18, 2020) was an American politician who served in the Hawaii Senate from the 16th district from 2015 to 2020. He served on the Honolulu City Council from the 8th district from 2011 to 2014.

Career 
Harimoto was appointed to the Hawaii Board of Education in May 2002 by Governor Ben Cayetano. He served on that board until his resignation in June 2010, and briefly served as the board chair. Prior to his appointment to the board, he had served as the deputy director of the City and County of Honolulu's Department of Information Technology.

Personal life 
Harimoto died of pancreatic cancer on June 18, 2020, in Pearl City, Hawaii at the age of 66.

References

1954 births
2020 deaths
Members of the Hawaii Board of Education
Honolulu City Council members
Democratic Party Hawaii state senators
Deaths from cancer in Hawaii
Deaths from pancreatic cancer
Asian-American city council members
Hawaii politicians of Japanese descent
21st-century American politicians